Kataev (Russian: Катаев) is a Russian surname and may refer to:

Ivan Kataev (1902–1937), Soviet writer
Valentin Kataev (1897–1986), Soviet writer
3608 Kataev, a minor planet